Pasatiempo (Spanish for "Pastime") is an unincorporated community and census-designated place (CDP) in Santa Cruz County, California, United States, located along State Route 17 between Scotts Valley and Santa Cruz. Bus service is provided by Santa Cruz Metro and the Highway 17 Express. The 2020 United States census reported Pasatiempo's population was 1,093.

The ZIP Code is 95060 and the community is part of area code 831.

History
Pasatiempo was founded by Marion Hollins, winner of the 1921 Women's U.S. Amateur Golf title and captain of the US Curtis Cup team in 1932.  Marion Hollins came to California in the mid-1920s to work for Samuel Morse, owner of the Pebble Beach company, and given responsibility for establishing Cypress Point golf club.  After Seth Raynor died, she hired Alister MacKenzie to design the course.  MacKenzie gives her credit for designing Cypress Point's famous par 3 16th hole.

After Cypress Point, Marion Hollins set out to build her own golf course and sports center, and on January 12, 1928 she announced that she would be building a sports and real estate complex on land just outside Santa Cruz, CA, calling the area Pasatiempo Estates.  She hired noted architect William Wurster to build her home, which still stands today at 33 Hollins Drive inside Pasatiempo.  She also brought in Alister MacKenzie to design a course at Pasatiempo Golf Club, which opened in September 1929 with a match featuring Bobby Jones   MacKenzie established his home in Pasatiempo, which still stands along the 6th Fairway of the course on Pasatiempo Drive.   Pasatiempo Golf Club is located in the community.

Although Marion Hollins' plans for Pasatiempo originally included a steeplechase course, bridle paths, a park and a beach club on Monterey Bay, her ambitious plans were thwarted by the Great Depression. In November 1940, she left Pasatiempo in a shakeup of Pasatiempo Estates and moved to Monterey, where she died of cancer.  Today, Pasatiempo Golf Club remains a Top 100 Golf Club, and the development still has the original clubhouse (now called the "Hollins House"), a swimming pool, and tennis courts.

Geography
According to the United States Census Bureau, the CDP covers an area of 0.9 square miles (2.3 km), all of it land.

Demographics

The 2010 United States Census reported that Pasatiempo had a population of 1,041. The racial makeup of Pasatiempo was 925 (88.9%) White, 5 (0.5%) African American, 6 (0.6%) Native American, 34 (3.3%) Asian, 1 (0.1%) Pacific Islander, 22 (2.1%) from other races, and 48 (4.6%) from two or more races. Hispanic or Latino of any race were 85 persons (8.2%).

The Census reported that 100% of the population lived in households.

There were 423 households, out of which 90 (21.3%) had children under the age of 18 living in them, 284 (67.1%) were opposite-sex married couples living together, 22 (5.2%) had a female householder with no husband present, 19 (4.5%) had a male householder with no wife present.  There were 13 (3.1%) unmarried opposite-sex partnerships, and 6 (1.4%) same-sex married couples or partnerships. Seventy-five households (17.7%) were made up of individuals, and 42 (9.9%) had someone living alone who was 65 years of age or older. The average household size was 2.46.  There were 325 families (76.8% of all households); the average family size was 2.74.

The population was spread out, with 170 people (16.3%) under the age of 18, 58 people (5.6%) aged 18 to 24, 159 people (15.3%) aged 25 to 44, 372 people (35.7%) aged 45 to 64, and 282 people (27.1%) who were 65 years of age or older.  The median age was 53.7 years. For every 100 females, there were 102.9 males.  For every 100 females age 18 and over, there were 103.5 males.

The homeowner vacancy rate was 1.5%; the rental vacancy rate was 4.9%. 89.5% of the population lived in owner-occupied housing units and 10.5% lived in rental housing units.

References

External links
 Pasatiempo Golf Club - Golf Course information with photos and interactive map.
 Santa Cruz Wiki - The People's Guide to Santa Cruz County, California.

Census-designated places in Santa Cruz County, California
Unincorporated communities in California
Census-designated places in California